Hatherop is a village and civil parish in the Cotswolds Area of Outstanding Natural Beauty, about  north of Fairford in Gloucestershire, England. The River Coln forms part of the western boundary of the parish.

History

The Domesday Book of 1086 lists Hatherop as Etherope, derived from the Old English hēah and throp meaning "high outlying farmstead".

The village and parish adjoin the parkland of Williamstrip, a 17th-century country house that was the seat of Michael Hicks Beach, the first Earl St Aldwyn.

Hatherop Castle dates from the sixteenth or seventeenth century, but was partly rebuilt by the architect Henry Clutton for Baron de Mauley in 1850–56.  The building is now a school. Clutton also rebuilt the Church of England parish church of Saint Nicholas for the same client in 1854–55.

The architect and builder Richard Pace built Severalls as a rectory for the parish in 1833. Letchmere, a set of cottages built in 1856, was later converted into a rectory and Severalls became a private house.

The  Hatherop Estate was acquired by the trustees of the Ernest Cook Trust in 2002 from the Bazley family, who had owned the estate for more than 130 years.

Following the death of Sir Thomas Bazley in 1996, his children were very keen to retain the community of the estate and avoid breaking it up. They said at the time: "One of the main factors in our decision to sell the estate to the Ernest Cook Trust is our wish to preserve the estate for future generations. We feel that selling to the Ernest Cook Trust is the best way to maintain its special character, as well as retaining the unspoilt nature of the villages of Eastleach and Hatherop, which our father valued so much."

Governance
Hatherop is part of the Fairford Ward of the district of Cotswold and is currently represented by Councillor Chris Roberts and Raymond Theodoulou, members of the Conservative Party. Hatherop is part of the constituency of Cotswold, represented at parliament by Conservative MP Geoffrey Clifton-Brown. It was part of the South West England constituency of the European Parliament prior to Britain leaving the European Union in January 2020.

Geography
Close by are the parishes of Coln St. Aldwyns and Quenington. The three villages lie on the edge of the parkland of 17th-century mansion Williamstrip, home of politician Michael Hicks Beach, the first Earl St Aldwyn. Nearby, to the west of Hatherop is the River Coln which flows through the Cotswolds.

Education
Hatherop has a Church of England primary school, which in 2006 had 68 pupils. Hatherop Castle  is now a private co-educational preparatory school.

References
Notes

Bibliography

External links

Villages in Gloucestershire
Cotswold District